Dil Kiya Karay is a 2019 Pakistani television series directed by Mehreen Jabbar, produced by 7th Sky Entertainment and written by Asma Nabeel of Khaani fame. The series features Feroze Khan and Yumna Zaidi in lead roles.

Synopsis 
Armaan is a handsome young man, who lives with his joint family in Pakistan. He has always been in love with his childhood best friend Aiman  who lives in the US. Armaan and Aiman share the same birthday and he collects gifts every year since she left at the age of twelve to give to her. He lives with his parents, grandmother, sister Faryal and aunt Rabia(uncle’s widow). 
Armaan also has a best friend Saadi, who he loves like a brother and whose parents Raza and Talat he considers his own ‘Baba’ and ‘Mama’. When Aiman finally comes from the US, soon her parents die, causing Armaan’s sister Faryal’s marriage to break due to superstitions, making his mother resentful. Armaan acts as a support system to Aiman and plans to confess his feelings to her. But soon he discovers that Aiman and Saadi are in love with each other since their university days in the US, causing him to corner his feelings for her. Armaan’s mother Rumaisa is a selfish and mean woman, who blames Aiman for his daughter’s marriage being broken and for ruining her son’s life. She misbehaves with Aiman, causing Armaan to become bitter for her.

Saadi marries Aiman and Armaan is heartbroken but sacrifices his love for his friends’ happiness. Saadi later finds out that Armaan loved Aiman and is disappointed that Armaan never told him and feels as betrayed.
Armaan moves to China to try and surround himself with work and forget Aiman.Aiman and Saadi, meanwhile lead a happy married life and are about to become parents. Armaan’s widow aunt Rabia meets a widower, Hussain who is a nice respectful man, who falls in love with her. But Rabia asks for some time in deciding to marry him. 
Saadi, who has joined his father’s trust, faces a lot of threats due to land possession disputes that worry his family.
Some time later, Saadi is kidnapped by a politician due to a land dispute. Armaan comes back and tries to save him but during the exchange of ransom, Saadi is shot while in Armaan’s arms. Aiman holds Armaan accountable for Saadi’s death. Armaan is mentally deranged after this and blames himself. He even becomes suicidal due to guilt. But when consoled by his own father as well as Saadi’s parents Raza and Talat, Armaan decides he should be there for Aiman and her child. He begins to take care of them, and begins their fight for justice against Saadi’s murderers.
After a lot of effort they finally prove that the man is guilty and he is punished.
During this time, Aiman realizes the depth of Armaan’s love for her, and also falls in love with him. Rabia marries Hussain and her life becomes joyful again. After Aiman saves Faryal from a rapist; Rumaisa realises her faults and apologises to everyone. Faryal finds her satisfaction in her work and realises that she doesn’t need a man to ‘complete her and also makes her mother realise this. Aiman decides to marry Armaan, and finally opens the presents he saved for her. They live happily, and bring up Saadi’s child with love.

Cast 

 Feroze Khan as Armaan Salman
 Yumna Zaidi as Aiman Saadi Raza/Aiman Armaan Salman
 Mariyam Nafees as Faryal
 Mirza Zain Baig As Saadi Raza 
 Marina Khan as Rumaisa (Armaan’s mother)
 Shamim Hilaly as Sohana Begum (Armaan’s grandmother)
 Lubna Aslam as Talat (Saadi’s mother)
 Abid Ali as Raza ( Saadi’s father)
 Sonia Rehman as Rabia
 Sarmad Khoosat as Hussain
 Tanveer Jamal as Salman
 Mizna Waqas as Zunaira
 Saman Ansari
 Zaheen Tahira As Bua
 Aliee Shaikh as Bilal (Saadi’s murderer)

Soundtrack 
The original soundtrack of Dil Kiya Karay is composed by Shahzad Ali and arranged and produced by Saad Sultan. Mustafa Zahid and Sharvari Deshpande have provided the vocals while the lyrics are by Shakeel Sohail. The song is available on Patari.

International release

Awards and nominations
 Mehreen Jabbar - Best Television Director at Pakistan International Screen Awards - Nominated

References

External links
Official website

Pakistani drama television series
Comedy-drama television series
Urdu-language television shows
2019 Pakistani television series debuts
Geo TV original programming